Prince Bernhard of Lippe-Biesterfeld (later Prince Bernhard of the Netherlands; 29 June 1911 – 1 December 2004) was a German nobleman who was Prince consort of the Netherlands from 6 September 1948 to 30 April 1980 as the husband of Queen Juliana. They were the parents of four children, including Beatrix, who was Queen of the Netherlands from 1980 to 2013.

Bernhard belonged to the princely House of Lippe and was a nephew of the Principality of Lippe's last sovereign Leopold IV. From birth he held the title Count of Biesterfeld; his uncle raised him to princely rank with the style of Serene Highness in 1916. He studied law and worked as an executive secretary at the Paris office of IG Farben. In 1937 he married Princess Juliana of the Netherlands, and was immediately given the title Prince of the Netherlands with the style of Royal Highness. Upon his wife's accession to the throne in 1948, he became the prince consort of the Netherlands.

Bernhard's private life was very controversial because he served as a SS officer for the Nazis prior to switching sides to the British. Despite this, he was respected for his performance as a combat pilot and his activities as a liaison officer and personal aide to Queen Wilhelmina during the Second World War, and for his work during post-war reconstruction. During World War II, he was part of the London-based Allied war planning councils. He saw active service as a Wing Commander (RAF), flying both fighter and bomber planes into combat. He was a Dutch general and Supreme Commander of the Dutch Armed forces, involved in negotiating the terms of surrender of the German Army in the Netherlands. For proven bravery, leadership and loyalty during his wartime efforts, he was appointed a Commander of the Military William Order, the Netherlands' oldest and highest honour. After the war he was made Honorary Air Marshal of the Royal Air Force by Queen Elizabeth II of the United Kingdom. In 1969, Bernhard was awarded the Grand Cross (Special Class) of the Order of Merit of the Federal Republic of Germany.

Bernhard helped found the World Wildlife Fund (WWF, later renamed World Wide Fund for Nature), becoming its first president in 1961. In 1970, along with Prince Philip, Duke of Edinburgh and other associates, he established the WWF's financial endowment "The 1001: A Nature Trust". In 1954, he was a co-founder of the international Bilderberg Group, which has met annually since then to discuss corporate globalisation and other issues concerning Europe and North America. He was forced to step down from both groups after being involved in the Lockheed Bribery Scandal in 1976.

Early life 
Bernhard was born Bernhard Leopold Friedrich Eberhard Julius Kurt Karl Gottfried Peter, Count of Biesterfeld in Jena, Saxe-Weimar-Eisenach, German Empire on 29 June 1911, the elder son of Prince Bernhard of Lippe and his wife, Baroness Armgard von Cramm. He was a grandson of Ernest, Count of Lippe-Biesterfeld, who was regent of the Principality of Lippe until 1904. He was also a nephew of the principality's last sovereign, Leopold IV, Prince of Lippe.

Because his parents' marriage did not conform with the marriage laws of the House of Lippe, it was initially deemed morganatic, so Bernhard was granted only the title of Count of Biesterfeld at birth. He and his brother could succeed to the Lippian throne only if the entire reigning House became extinct. In 1916, his uncle Leopold IV as reigning Prince raised Bernhard and his mother to Prince and Princess of Lippe-Biesterfeld, thereby retroactively according his parents' marriage dynastic status. The suffix Biesterfeld was revived to mark the beginning of a new cadet line of the House of Lippe.

After World War I, Bernhard's family lost their German Principality and the revenue that had accompanied it, but the family was still reasonably well-off. Bernhard spent his early years at Reckenwalde castle (Wojnowo, Poland), the family's new estate in East Brandenburg, thirty kilometres east of the River Oder. He was taught privately and received his early education at home. When he was twelve, he was sent to board at the Gymnasium in Züllichau (Sulechów). Several years later he was sent to board at a Gymnasium in Berlin, from which he graduated in 1929.

Bernhard suffered from poor health as a boy. Doctors predicted that he would not live very long. This prediction might have inspired Bernhard's reckless driving and the risks that he took in the Second World War and thereafter. The prince wrecked several cars and planes in his lifetime.

Bernhard studied law at the University of Lausanne, Switzerland, and in Berlin. In the latter city, he also acquired a taste for fast cars, horse riding, and big-game hunting safaris. He was nearly killed in a boating accident and in an aeroplane crash. He suffered a broken neck and crushed ribs in a 160 km/h (100 mph) car crash in 1938.

While at university, Bernhard joined the Nazi Party. He also enrolled in the Sturmabteilung (SA), which he left in December 1934 when he graduated and went to work for IG Farben. The Prince later denied that he had belonged to SA, to the Reiter-SS (SS Cavalry Corps), and to the NSKK, but these are well-documented memberships. While he was not a fierce champion of democracy, the Prince was never known to hold any radical political views or express any racist sentiments, although he admitted that he briefly had sympathised with Adolf Hitler's regime.

The Prince eventually went to work for the German chemical giant IG Farben in the early 1930s, then the world's fourth-largest company. (It survives today as BASF, AGFA, and Bayer). He joined the statistics department of IG Farben's Berlin N.W. 7 department, the main Nazi overseas espionage centre (known as VOWI) that evolved into the economic intelligence arm of the Wehrmacht. He lodged with Count Paul von Kotzebue (1884-1966), an exiled Russian nobleman of German descent, and his wife Allene Tew, who was born in the United States. After training, Bernhard became secretary in 1935 to the board of directors at the Paris office.

Marriage and children

Bernhard met then-Princess Juliana at the 1936 Winter Olympics at Garmisch-Partenkirchen. Juliana's mother, Queen Wilhelmina, had spent most of the 1930s looking for a suitable husband for Juliana. As a Protestant of royal rank (the Lippes were a sovereign house in the German Empire), Bernhard was deemed acceptable for the devoutly religious Wilhelmina. They were distantly related, seventh cousins, both descending from Lebrecht, Prince of Anhalt-Zeitz-Hoym. Wilhelmina left nothing to chance, and had her lawyers draft a very detailed prenuptial agreement that specified exactly what Bernhard could and could not do. The couple's engagement was announced on 8 September 1936, and they were married at The Hague on 7 January 1937. Earlier, Bernhard had been granted Dutch citizenship and changed the spelling of his names from German to Dutch. Previously styled as Serene Highness, he became a Royal Highness by Dutch law. His appropriateness as consort of the future Queen would later become a matter of considerable public debate.

Prince Bernhard fathered six children, four of them with Queen Juliana. The eldest daughter is Beatrix, (born 1938), who later became Queen of the Netherlands. His other daughters with Juliana are Irene (born 1939), Margriet (born 1943) and Christina (1947–2019).

He had two "natural", or illegitimate, daughters. The first is Alicia von Bielefeld (born in San Francisco on 21 June 1952). Von Bielefeld has become a landscape architect and lives in the United States. His sixth daughter, Alexia Grinda (a.k.a. Alexia Lejeune or Alexia Grinda-Lejeune, born in Paris on 10 July 1967), is his child by Hélène Grinda, a French socialite and fashion model. Although rumours about these two children were already widespread, their status as his daughters was made official after his death. In December 2008, Dutch historian Cees Fasseur claimed that Jonathan Aitken, former British Conservative Cabinet Minister, was also a child of Prince Bernhard, the result of his wartime affair with Penelope Maffey.

Attitudes to Nazi Germany 
Prince Bernhard was a member of the "Reiter-SS", a mounted unit of the SS and had joined the Nazi party before the war. He later also joined the National Socialist Motor Corps.

Various members of his family and friends were aligned with the Nazis prior to the Second World War, and a number of them attended the royal wedding. Protocol demanded that the prospective Prince-Consort be invited to an audience with his head of state, who at the time was Adolf Hitler. Hitler gave an account of the conversation he had with Bernhard in his Tischgespräche (Table Conversations). This book was a collection of monologues, remarks, and speeches Hitler gave during lunch or dinner to those he had invited.

The Prince's brother, Prince Aschwin of Lippe-Biesterfeld, was an officer in the German Army. Although the secret services on both sides were interested in this peculiar pair of brothers, no improper contacts or leaks of information were ever discovered. He cut off relations with those members of his family who were enthusiastic Nazis. As a sign of his "Dutchness", near the end of the war, he spoke only Dutch when negotiating the surrender of German forces in the Netherlands.

Second World War

At the outset of the Second World War, during the German invasion of the Netherlands, the Prince, carrying a machine gun, organised the palace guards into a combat group and shot at German warplanes. The Royal family fled the Netherlands and took refuge in England. Disagreeing with Queen Wilhelmina's decision to leave the Kingdom, the young Prince Consort, aged 28, is said at first to have refused to go and to have wanted to oppose the Nazi occupation from within the country. However, in the end, he agreed to join his wife and became head of the Royal Military Mission based in London. His wife Princess Juliana and their children continued on to Canada, where they remained until the end of the war.

In England, Prince Bernhard asked to work in British Intelligence. The War Admiralty, and later General Eisenhower's Allied Command offices, did not trust him enough to allow him access to sensitive intelligence information. On the recommendation of Bernhard's friend and admirer King George VI, however, who was also of German aristocratic descent through his mother Mary of Teck and his great-grandfather Prince Albert, and after Bernhard was personally screened by British intelligence officer Ian Fleming at the behest of Winston Churchill, he was later given work to do in the Allied War Planning Councils.

"For Bernhard, the Prince of the Netherlands, the war was a frustrating business. Born a German, he had married Queen Wilhelmina's only child, Princess Juliana, and in due time made a conscious and meaningful transition of loyalties to his new homeland. Because of this, and in view of the doubts his background initially evoked among some Britons, he longed more than anyone for a chance to get at Holland's aggressors." Erik Hazelhoff Roelfzema aka "Soldier of Orange", decorated war hero.

On 25 June 1940, three days after France fell to the German war machine, Bernhard spoke on the Overseas Service of the BBC. He called Hitler a German tyrant and expressed his confidence that Britain would defeat the Third Reich.

In 1940, Flight Lieutenant Murray Payne gave the prince instruction in flying a Spitfire. The prince made 1,000 flight-hours in a Spitfire with the RAF's No. 322 (Dutch) Squadron RAF, wrecking two planes during landings. He remained an active pilot throughout his life and flew his last aeroplane 53 years later, with his grandson and heir to the throne, who inherited his passion for flying.

In 1941, Prince Bernhard was given the honorary rank of wing commander in the Royal Air Force. As "Wing Commander Gibbs (RAF)", Prince Bernhard flew over occupied Europe, attacking V-1 launch pads in a B-24 Liberator, bombing Pisa, and engaging submarines over the Atlantic in a B-25 Mitchell, and conducting reconnaissance over enemy-held territory in an L-5 Grasshopper. Prince Bernhard was awarded the Dutch Airman's Cross for his "ability and perseverance" (Dutch: "bekwaamheid en volharding"). In 1941 he also received a promotion to Honorary Air Commodore.

He also helped organise the Dutch resistance movement and acted as the personal secretary for Queen Wilhelmina.

Queen Wilhelmina erased the style "honorary" (the exact words were "à la suite") in the decree promoting Bernhard to General. In this unconstitutional manner, she gave this Royal Prince a status that was never intended by either Parliament or her Ministers. The Minister of Defence did not choose to correct the Monarch, and the Prince took an active and important role in the Dutch armed forces.

By 1944, Prince Bernhard became Commander of the Dutch Armed Forces. After the liberation of the Netherlands, he returned with his family and became active in the negotiations for the German surrender. He was present during the Armistice negotiations and German surrender at Hotel de Wereld ("The World Hotel"), Wageningen in The Netherlands on 5 May 1945, where he avoided speaking German.
The Prince was a genuine war hero in the eyes of most of the Dutch; he kept cordial relations with the Communists who fought against the Nazis. In the post-war years, he earned respect for his work in helping to reinvigorate the economy of the Netherlands.

Postwar roles 

After the War, the position of Inspector General was created for the Prince.
On 4 September 1948, his mother-in-law Queen Wilhelmina abdicated the throne and Juliana became Queen of the Netherlands and Bernhard became Prince Consort of the Netherlands. He was made a member of the boards of supervisors of Fokker Aircraft and KLM Royal Dutch Airlines, and within a few years he had been invited to serve as an adviser or non-executive director of numerous corporations and institutions. There have been claims that KLM helped Nazis to leave Germany for Argentina on KLM flights while Bernhard was on its board. After a 1952 trip with Queen Juliana to the United States, Prince Bernhard was heralded by the media as a business ambassador extraordinaire for the Netherlands.

With his global contacts having been approached by the secretive Polish diplomat, Józef Retinger, in May 1954 Bernhard was a major figure in organising a meeting at the Bilderberg Hotel in the Netherlands for the business elite and intellectuals of the Western World to discuss the economic problems in the face of what they characterised as the growing threat from Communism. This first meeting was successful, and it became an annual gathering known as the Bilderberg Group. The idea for the European Union, first proposed by Robert Schuman on 9 May 1950, was encouraged at Bilderberg.

Prince Bernhard was a very outspoken person who often flouted protocol by remarking upon subjects about which he felt deeply. Almost until his last day, he called for more recognition for the Polish veterans of the Second World War, who had figured greatly in the liberation of the Netherlands. But it was not until after his death that the Dutch Government publicly recognised the important role of the Polish Army in the liberation: on 31 May 2006, at the Binnenhof in The Hague, Queen Beatrix conferred the Military William Order, the highest Dutch military decoration, on the Polish 1st Independent Parachute Brigade. The award is now worn by the 6th Airborne Brigade which inherited the battle honours of the brigade.

Friendships and international connections 
Prince Bernhard was seen as a jet-setting and charismatic ambassador for the Dutch during post-war reconstruction. Because of his connections, Prince Bernhard reportedly maintained friendships with several high-profile international figures. They included Nelson Mandela, David Rockefeller, Mohammad Reza Pahlavi, Ian Fleming, and Walter Bedell Smith.

Scandals and rumours

Hofmans Affair 
In the mid-1950s, Queen Juliana and Prince Bernhard's marriage faced significant strain because of the ongoing influence of Greet Hofmans, a faith healer and layer-on of hands. For nine years she acted as a confidante and adviser to Queen Juliana, often residing at Palace Soestdijk. Originally, Hofmans was introduced to Queen Juliana at the initiative of Prince Bernhard in 1948 to treat an eye illness of their youngest daughter, Princess Christina (then still called Marijke). This illness arose because Juliana was infected with rubella during pregnancy. Hofmans developed a great influence on the Queen, encouraging pacifist ideas. In the period of the Cold War, this caused a crisis in the Royal Household.

While the Dutch press did not report widely on the issue, outside the Netherlands, a great deal was written about the Hofmans affair. On 13 June 1956, an article was published in the German magazine Der Spiegel, titled "Zwischen Königin und Rasputin" – "between the Queen and her Rasputin". It portrayed Hofmans in a less-than-flattering way. Later, Bernhard admitted that he had personally provided the information for the article. Observers said that, in doing so, he hoped to have Hofmans removed from the court. In the face of escalating tensions, the Prime Minister, Willem Drees appointed a committee of "three wise men" (elder statesmen) to advise the royal couple. Hofmans was banished as were various allies and supporters who had grown to prominence within the Royal Household.

In 2008 the report of the "three wise men" was made public. Historian Cees Fasseur drew from it for his book, Juliana & Bernhard (2008); in addition, the Queen had granted him access to the private royal archive. He noted that Bernhard was reprimanded in 1956 for having leaked confidential information to the international press. Fasseur said that Bernhard resorted to bringing in the international press only after repeated, desperate and often dramatic pleading with his wife to distance herself from the Hofmans group. Fasseur wrote: 
"Bernard was obviously a free spirited chap, who independently went about his business. But he was still very much a family man. I got the feeling he was the only one that was seeing things were getting completely out of hand and tried to salvage the situation as much as he could."

Lockheed scandal 

Scandal rocked the Royal family in 1976 when the press reported that Prince Bernhard had accepted a US$1.1 million bribe from U.S. aircraft manufacturer Lockheed Corporation to influence the Dutch government's purchase of fighter aircraft. At the time he had served on more than 300 corporate boards and committees worldwide and had been praised in the Netherlands for his efforts to promote the economic well-being of the country. Prime Minister of the Netherlands Joop den Uyl ordered an inquiry into the Lockheed affair. Prince Bernhard refused to answer reporters' questions, stating: "I am above such things".

The Dutch and international press headlined the stories for months. They also brought up records of Prince Bernhard's Reiter SS membership and details of his numerous extramarital affairs. They noted he had purchased a luxurious Paris apartment for his mistress Hélène Grinda (granddaughter of Édouard Grinda), with whom he had a daughter, Alexia, who was illegitimate. Bernhard had an older illegitimate daughter, Alicia, born in the United States (with a German pilot whom he met in Mexico in 1951).

On 26 August 1976, a full report of Prince Bernhard's activities was released to a shocked Dutch public. The Prince's own letter of 1974, to Lockheed Corporation, was publicised; he had demanded "commissions" be paid to him on Dutch government aircraft purchases. This was very damaging evidence of improper conduct by the man who was Inspector-General of the Dutch Armed Forces. Out of respect for Queen Juliana, the government did not press charges against Bernhard.

Prince Bernhard resigned as Inspector-General of the Dutch Armed Forces. He was no longer officially allowed to wear a uniform in public. But a few years later, he was in full military dress when he attended the 1979 funeral of Lord Mountbatten in London.

Prime Minister Joop den Uyl made a statement in Parliament and told the delegates that the Prince would also resign from his various high-profile positions in businesses, charities, and other institutions. The Dutch States-General voted against criminal prosecution. Prince Bernhard turned over the Presidency of the international World Wildlife Fund to Prince Philip, Duke of Edinburgh.

In an interview published after his death, on 14 December 2004, Prince Bernhard admitted that he had accepted more than one million dollars (US) in bribes from Lockheed. He acknowledged it was a mistake and claimed that all of the money went to the WWF. He said: "I have accepted that the word Lockheed will be carved on my tombstone." He also confirmed having fathered two illegitimate daughters.

In February 2008, Joop den Uyl's biography claimed that the official report investigating the Lockheed bribe scandal also presented proof that the Prince had accepted money from yet another aerospace firm: Northrop. The former Prime Minister claimed he had not made the information public to protect the Dutch monarchy.

Project Lock 

In 1988, Prince Bernhard and Princess Juliana sold two paintings from their personal collection to raise money for the World Wildlife Fund. The paintings sold for GBP700,000, which was deposited in a Swiss WWF bank account. In 1989, however, Charles de Haes, Director-General of the WWF, transferred GBP500,000 back to Bernhard, for what De Haes called a private project. In 1991, newspapers reported what this private project was: Prince Bernhard had hired KAS International, owned by Special Air Service founder Sir David Stirling, to use mercenaries – mostly British – to fight poachers in nature reserves. The paramilitary group infiltrated organisations profiting from illegal trade in ivory  to arrest them.

This Project Lock seemed to have backfired enormously, however. The hired mercenaries had not only infiltrated the illegal trade, they were also participating in it.

In 1995, Nelson Mandela called upon the Kumleben Commission to investigate, among other things, the role of the WWF in apartheid-South Africa. In the report that followed, it was suggested that mercenaries from Project Lock had planned assassinations of ANC members and that mercenaries had been running training camps in the wildlife reserves, training fighters from the anti-communist groups UNITA and Renamo. Prince Bernhard was never accused of any crime in this context, but the Project Lock scandal negatively impacted the Prince's reputation.

Additional controversies and rumours 
Prince Bernhard garnered media attention when, on 30 October 2002, he paid the fines of two Albert Heijn supermarket staff members, who were convicted of assaulting a shoplifter after they detained him.

The 2009 publication HRH: High Stakes at the Court of His Royal Highness by historian Harry Veenendaal and journalist Jort Kelder alleges that the Prince in 1950 attempted to oust the young government of the newly founded Republic of Indonesia and place himself to lead the Islands as Viceroy similar to Lord Mountbatten's role in British India. This was particularly contentious as in 1949 the Netherlands had already officially recognised its former colony as an independent nation.

A 2016 biography by Jolande Withuis about his wife queen Juliana, titled Juliana, posited further rumours including that he had once sexually assaulted a minor, that he had refused to divorce the queen twice, and that later on during their final years in life he prohibited Juliana from seeing him.

Later life and death 

In 1994, the Prince had a colon tumour removed and suffered severe complications due to respiratory distress. In December, his daughter Queen Beatrix rushed to the hospital straight after landing from a trip to Africa. By Christmas the prospect of death had faded and by spring the next year he recovered enough to go home. His health problems continued in 1998 when he had a prostate swelling and in 1999 when he suffered difficulties breathing and talking. He did, however, attend the wedding of his grandson, straight after having prostate surgery. In 2000, his life was endangered again when he suffered neurological complications and continued breathing problems. Two days after intensive medical attention the Royal Press Office issued a statement the Prince was reading newspapers again.

Over the following years Bernhard continued to appear at the military parades on the national liberation day celebrating the defeat of Nazi Germany. Only when his wife Juliana died in March 2004 did the Prince become exceedingly fragile. Up to the last moment it remained uncertain if he could attend the royal funeral, which he eventually managed to attend. He said his final farewells to his war comrades on Liberation Day in May and in November that same year he was diagnosed with untreatable cancer.

Prince Bernhard died of lung cancer at the age of 93 at University Medical Center Utrecht in Utrecht on 1 December 2004, two years after the death of his son-in-law Prince Claus; his death suffered from malignant lung and intestinal tumors. On 11 December 2004, he was interred with a state funeral at the Nieuwe Kerk, Delft. Bernhard's funeral was different from those of Prince Claus and Queen Juliana in that Bernhard's coffin was transported on the undercarriage of a cannon instead of in the traditional carriage used when the coffins of Prince Claus and Queen Juliana were transported to Delft. Together with the playing of many military marches and the forming of guards of honour by Second World War veterans this gave the funeral procession a military character as the late Prince, a Second World War veteran, had wished. As a final tribute to his former military role in the Royal Netherlands Air Force, three modern F-16 jet fighters and a World War II Spitfire plane performed a low flypast during the funeral in a classic missing man formation.

In popular culture 
In the years after Bernhard died his life story has been the inspiration for literature, theatre, television and comic books. In 2010 fact and fiction of the life of Bernhard was portrayed in a Dutch television series. In a biographical dissertation by Dutch journalist and historian Annejet van der Zijl published in March 2010, Bernhard was called "a failure" in the history of the Dutch Royal Family and a "creature of his own myths".

Titles, styles and honours

Titles
29 June 1911 – 1916: Count Bernhard of Biesterfeld
1916 – 7 January 1937: His Serene Highness Prince Bernhard of Lippe-Biesterfeld
7 January 1937 – 6 September 1948: His Royal Highness Prince Bernhard of the Netherlands, Prince of Lippe-Biesterfeld
6 September 1948 – 30 April 1980: His Royal Highness The Prince of the Netherlands
30 April 1980 – 1 December 2004: His Royal Highness Prince Bernhard of the Netherlands, Prince of Lippe-Biesterfeld

Honours

National honours
 Commander of the Military William Order
 Knight Grand Cross of the Order of the Netherlands Lion
 Knight Grand Cross of the Order of Orange-Nassau
 Grand Master & Commander of the Order of the Golden Ark
 Commander of the Order of St. John in the Netherlands
 Recipient of the Airman's Cross
 Recipient of the Queen Juliana Inauguration Medal

Foreign honours
 : Grand Cross of the Order of the Liberator General San Martín
 : Grand Star of the Decoration for Services to the Republic of Austria
 : Grand Cordon with crossed swords of the Order of Leopold
 : Recipient of the Croix de guerre
 :
 Grand Cross of the Order of the Southern Cross
 Grand Cross of the Order of Aeronautical Merit
 Grand Cross of the Order of Naval Merit
 : Grand Cordon of the Order of Valour
 : Grand Cross of the Order of Merit
 : Grand Cross of the Order of the White Lion
 : Recipient of the Czechoslovak War Cross 1939–1945
 : Grand Cross of the Order of Merit
 : Grand Cross of the Order of Boyaca, Special Class
 : Knight of the Order of the Elephant
 : Grand Cross with Silver Breast Star  of the Order of Merit of Duarte, Sánchez and Mella
 : Member 1st Class of the Order of Abdon Calderón
  Ethiopian Imperial Family: Collar of the Order of the Queen of Sheba
 : Grand Cross of the Order of the White Rose of Finland
 : Grand Cross of the Order of the Legion of Honour
 : Commander of the Order of Academic Palms
 : Recipient of the Aeronautical Medal
 : Grand Cross special class of the Order of Merit of the Federal Republic of Germany
 Greece
  Greek Royal Family: Knight Grand Cross of the Order of George I
 : Recipient of the 1940 War Cross Medal
 : Grand Cross of the Order of Santa Rosa and of Civilisation
 : Order of the star of Mahaputera|Star of Mahaputera, 1st Class
  Iranian Imperial Family: Knight Grand Cordon of the Order of the Lion and the Sun
  Iranian Imperial Family: Recipient of the Commemorative Medal of the 2,500 year Celebration of the Persian Empire
 : Knight Grand Cross of the Order of Merit of the Italian Republic
 : Grand Cross of the National Order of the Ivory Coast
 : Grand Cordon of the Order of the Rising Sun
 : Grand Cordon of the Order of the Pioneers of Liberia
 : Knight of the Order of the Gold Lion of the House of Nassau
 : Recipient of the War Cross Medal 1939–1945
 : Collar of the Order of the Aztec Eagle
  Nepal: Member of the Order of Ojaswi Rajanya
 : Grand Cross of the Order of Rubén Darío, Special Class
 : Knight Grand Cross of the Order of Saint Olav
 : Grand Cross of the Order of Manuel Amador Guerrero
 : Grand Cross of the Order of Merit, Special Class
 : Grand Cross of the Order of the Sun of Peru
 : Grand Cross of the Order of Military Virtue
 : Grand Cross of the National Order of Merit
 : Bailiff Knight Grand Cross of Honour and Devotion of the Sovereign Military Order of Malta
 : Knight Grand Cross of the Order of Charles III
 : Grand Cross of the Honorary Order of the Yellow Star
 : Knight of the Royal Order of the Seraphim
 : Knight of the Order of the Royal House of Chakri
 : Grand Cross of the Order of Independence
 : Honorary Knight Grand Cross of the Order of the Bath
 : Honorary Knight Grand Cross of the Royal Victorian Order
 : Recipient of the France and Germany Star
 : Recipient of the Defence Medal
 : Recipient of the King George VI Coronation Medal
 : Recipient of the Queen Elizabeth II Coronation Medal
 : Chief Commander of the Legion of Merit
 : Grand Cross of the Order of the Liberator
 : Grand Cross of the Order of Karađorđe's Star

Military ranks

Military ranks of the Armed forces of the Netherlands

Honorary military ranks of foreign armed forces

Ancestry

References

External links 

 
 
 

1911 births
2004 deaths
20th-century Calvinist and Reformed Christians
Aide-de-camp to the Monarch of the Netherlands
Burials in the Royal Crypt at Nieuwe Kerk, Delft
Chairmen of the Steering Committee of the Bilderberg Group
Commanders-in-chief of the Armed Forces of the Netherlands
Converts to Calvinism from Lutheranism
Counts of Lippe
Counts of Lippe-Biesterfeld
Deaths from lung cancer in the Netherlands
Deaths from stomach cancer
Dutch animal rights activists
Dutch conservationists
Dutch lobbyists
Dutch members of the Dutch Reformed Church
Dutch nonprofit directors
Dutch nonprofit executives
Dutch people of German descent
Dutch royal consorts
Engelandvaarders
German Calvinist and Reformed Christians
German Lutherans
German royalty
Grand Cordons of the Honorary Order of the Yellow Star
Grand Cordons of the Order of the Rising Sun
Grand Croix of the Légion d'honneur
Grand Crosses Special Class of the Order of Merit of the Federal Republic of Germany
Grand Crosses of the Order of George I
Grand Crosses of the Order of the Sun of Peru
Grand Crosses of the Order of the White Lion
Honorary air commodores
Honorary Knights Grand Cross of the Order of the Bath
Honorary Knights Grand Cross of the Royal Victorian Order
House of Lippe
House of Orange-Nassau
Humboldt University of Berlin alumni
Inspectors general
Knights Commander of the Military Order of William
Knights Grand Cross of the Order of Merit of the Italian Republic
Knights Grand Cross of the Order of Orange-Nassau
Knights of the Order of Saint John in the Netherlands
Knights of the Order of the Netherlands Lion
Lockheed bribery scandals
Members of the Council of State (Netherlands)
Members of the Steering Committee of the Bilderberg Group
National Socialist Motor Corps members
Military personnel from Jena
People from Saxe-Weimar-Eisenach
Political controversies in the Netherlands
Princes of Lippe
Princes of Lippe-Biesterfeld
Protestant Church Christians from the Netherlands
Recipients of the Airman's Cross
Recipients of the Czechoslovak War Cross
Recipients of the Order of Orange-Nassau
Royal Air Force air marshals
Royal Air Force personnel of World War II
Royal Australian Air Force officers
Royal Netherlands Air Force generals
Royal Netherlands Air Force personnel of World War II
Royal Netherlands Air Force pilots
Royal Netherlands Army generals
Royal Netherlands Army personnel of World War II
Royal Netherlands East Indies Army generals
Royal Netherlands East Indies Army officers
Royal Netherlands East Indies Army personnel of World War II
Royal Netherlands Navy admirals
Royal Netherlands Navy personnel of World War II
University of Lausanne alumni
World Wide Fund for Nature
Nansen Refugee Award laureates
Recipients of orders, decorations, and medals of Ethiopia